The 1986 Swedish Golf Tour was the inaugural season of the Swedish Golf Tour, a series of professional golf tournaments for women held in Sweden.

Pia Nilsson won two tournaments and Liselotte Neumann won the Order of Merit

Schedule
The season consisted of 7 tournaments played between May and October, where two events were part of the 1986 Ladies European Tour.

Order of Merit

Source:

References

External links
Official homepage of the Swedish Golf Tour

Swedish Golf Tour (women)
Swedish Golf Tour (women)